Due West: Our Sex Journey is a 2012 Hong Kong 3-D erotic film directed and written by Mark Wu, starring Justin Cheung, Gregory Wong, Celia Kwok, Jeana Ho, and Daniella Wang. It is based on the erotic novel entitled Dongguan Wood, first published as a series of online stories by pseudonymous author Xiang Xi Murakami Haruki. The film premiered in Hong Kong on 20 September 2012.

Cast
 Justin Cheung as Frankie
 Gregory Wong as Wong Jing, Frankie's best friend.
 Jessica Kizaki as AV Girl
 Tony Ho as Father of Frankie
 Ng Lai-chu as Mother of Frankie
 Aliza Mo as Zoey, Frankie's high school classmate whom he has a slight crush on
 Angelina Cheung as Margaret, Frankie's girlfriend when he studied in the United Kingdom.
 Celia Kwok as Zeta, an airline stewardess, Frankie's girlfriend where he got to know her in a restaurant.
 Jeana Ho as Fish (Xiaoyu), a sexy girl in a nightclub.
 Daniella Wang as Celia (Xiaosi), a sex worker in a Dongguan hotel, Frankie made love with her.
 Eva Li as Juliet 
 Wylien Chiu as Susan
 Tin Kai-man as Du wen
 Polly Leung as Manager Jackie
 Wong Oi-ming

Release
The film was released on 20 September 2012 in Hong Kong, Australia, and New Zealand. In an unusual distribution decision, some "women-only" exhibitions were scheduled in Hong Kong.

Reception
Variety's Richard Kuipers called the film "a reasonably amusing 'American Pie'-like account of a randy Hong Kong teenager’s sexual awakening [that] . . . gradually becomes flaccid as its protag enters adulthood".  Derek Elley of Film Business Asia thought the film was better directed than Wu's previous efforts and "well-staged", with  "lots of t&a, lots of harmless softcore sex, and lots of juvenile Cantonese comedy".

References

External links
 

2010s Cantonese-language films
2012 3D films
2012 films
2010s erotic films
Hong Kong 3D films
Films set in Guangdong
Hong Kong erotic films
2010s Mandarin-language films
2010s Hong Kong films